Lékabi-Léwolo is a department of Haut-Ogooué Province in Gabon. It had a population of 4,914 in 2013.

References 

Departments of Gabon